Gary Steven Woolford  (born May 4, 1954 in Cairo, Illinois) is a former professional American football defensive back who played for the New York Giants in 1980. Woolford played college football at Florida State.

References

External links

1954 births
Living people
Players of American football from Illinois
American football defensive backs
Florida State Seminoles football players
Western Illinois Leathernecks football players
New York Giants players